Zephyrhills North is a census-designated place (CDP) in Pasco County, Florida, United States.  The population was 2,544 at the 2000 census.

Geography
Zephyrhills North is located at  (28.250083, -82.165528).

Demographics

As of the census of 2000, there were 2,544 people, 1,298 households, and 842 families residing in the CDP. The racial makeup of the CDP was 94.34% White, 1.14% African American, 0.67% Native American, 1.38% Asian, 0.04% Pacific Islander, 1.06% from other races, and 1.38% from two or more races. Hispanic or Latino of any race were 3.30% of the population.

There were 1,298 households, out of which 13.1% had children under the age of 18 living with them, 54.7% were married couples living together, 8.8% had a female householder with no husband present, and 35.1% were non-families. 31.0% of all households were made up of individuals, and 22.0% had someone living alone who was 65 years of age or older.  The average household size was 1.96 and the average family size was 2.37.

In the CDP, the population was spread out, with 12.9% under the age of 18, 4.8% from 18 to 24, 14.6% from 25 to 44, 20.3% from 45 to 64, and 47.4% who were 65 years of age or older.  The median age was 64 years. For every 100 females, there were 81.5 males.  For every 100 females age 18 and over, there were 79.1 males.

The median income for a household in the CDP was $29,462, and the median income for a family was $32,897. Males had a median income of $28,214 versus $20,529 for females. The per capita income for the CDP was $16,344.  About 6.6% of families and 10.7% of the population were below the poverty line, including 24.2% of those under age 18 and 5.3% of those age 65 or over.

References

Census-designated places in Pasco County, Florida
Census-designated places in Florida